This Prize for best promotional comic is awarded to comics at the Angoulême International Comics Festival from 1986 to 1992, and again since 2003. It is intended to crown the best communication campaign supported by comics of the past year.
As is the customary practice in Wikipedia for listing awards such as Oscar results, the winner of the award for that year is listed first, the others listed below are the nominees.

1980s
 1986: Lutte contre le vandalisme dans les cabines publiques by Frank Margerin
 1987: Felix et le bus, collaboration
 1988: Pas de sida pour Miss Poireau by Mandryka and Claude Moliterni
 1989: La Var, le département dont vous êtres le héros by Floc'h and Fromental
 Special mention for Vae Victis, la BD derrière les barreaux by Didier Savard

1990s
 1990: Un arbre n’est pas une ville by Fromental and Floc'h
 1991: Rires et chansons by Vuillemin
 Special mention for Egoïste by Jacques Tardi
 1992: Hergée
 Special mention for Dossier de Chanel by Pierre Le-Tan
 (1993: no award in this category)
 (1994: no award in this category)
 (1995: no award in this category)
 (1996: no award in this category)
 (1997: no award in this category)
 (1998: no award in this category)
 (1999: no award in this category)

2000s
 (2000: no award in this category)
 (2001: no award in this category)
 (2002: no award in this category)
 2003: Les Eaux Blessées by Dominique David, Cristina Cuadra and Rudi Miel, for the European Parliament
 2004: Changeons de regard. Faut pô avoir peur by Zep for the city of Angoulême and Handicap International
 2005: 24 heures sous tension by Denis Bodart (artist) and Périé and Mykaïa (authors) for Pfizer
 (2006: no award in this category)

Best promotional comic